Amauris damocles, the small monk, is a butterfly in the family Nymphalidae. It is found in Senegal, Gambia, Guinea, Burkina Faso, Sierra Leone, Liberia, Ivory Coast, Ghana, Togo, Benin, Nigeria, Cameroon and Tanzania. The habitat consists of dry forests, Guinea savanna and disturbed areas in the rainforest zone.

This species is mimicked by one of the forms of Hypolimnas anthedon.

The larvae probably feed on Pergularia species.

Subspecies
Amauris damocles damocles (Senegal, Gambia, Guinea, Burkina Faso, Sierra Leone, Liberia, Ivory Coast, Ghana, Togo, Benin, Nigeria, western Cameroon)
Amauris damocles makuyensis Carcasson, 1964 (western Tanzania)

References

Seitz, A. Die Gross-Schmetterlinge der Erde 13: Die Afrikanischen Tagfalter. Plate XIII 25 as egialea

Butterflies described in 1793
Amauris